Provincial Trunk Highway 190 (PTH 190), also known as CentrePort Canada Way, is a provincial highway in the Canadian province of Manitoba.  It connects the Perimeter Highway with Winnipeg Route 25 (Inkster Boulevard) in the City of Winnipeg; part of the highway passes through the neighbouring Rural Municipality of Rosser.  The highway includes a traffic interchange at the junction with the Perimeter Highway, as well as a grade separation over the CP Rail main line.  The highway is intended to service the industrial lands west of James Armstrong Richardson Winnipeg International Airport, which will be a part of the CentrePort Canada cargo hub. It is numbered for its ultimate role in connecting Highway 1 with Winnipeg Route 90.

PTH 190 is one of four three-digit urban expressway routes in the Manitoba highway network.

CentrePort Canada Way was opened to traffic on November 22, 2013.  The expressway was officially opened at a ribbon cutting ceremony attended by Prime Minister Stephen Harper, Manitoba Premier Greg Selinger and Diane Gray, CentrePort Canada President and CEO.

Future
The Province of Manitoba has plans to extend CentrePort Canada Way west to the Highway 1 / Highway 26 intersection near St. François Xavier, bypassing the signalized intersections in Headingley and also referred to as the Headingley Bypass. No timeline has been set for construction.

Major intersections
From west to east:

See also
CentrePort Canada

References

External links

CentrePort Canada Way

Expressways in Manitoba
190
Streets and squares in Winnipeg